An Autumn Story (Bir Sonbahar Hikayesi) is a 1994 Turkish film directed by Yavuz Özkan. The plot focuses on the relations of a couple during the post-coup days of the 1980s. The film won the N.F. Eczacıbaşı Foundation Award for Best Turkish Film of the Year

Cast
Zuhal Olcay
Nazan Kesal
Can Togay
 Sinem Uretmen

References

1994 films
Turkish drama films